Thug Life was an American hip hop group that consisted of 2Pac, Big Syke, Mopreme, Stretch,  Macadoshis, and The Rated R. They released one album, 1994's Thug Life, Volume I, before disbanding in 1995.

Etymology
According to Tupac, the name originally started as an acronym: "The Hate U Give Little Infants Fucks Everybody". It represented the idea that the racism and marginalization experienced by black youth ends up negatively affecting society.

History
Big Syke was a Crips gang member and Macadoshis was a drug dealer during the 1990s. Tupac, Randy "Stretch" Walker and Princess Mel formed Thug Life in 1992 with Tyruss "Little Psycho" Himes. They recorded a song also titled "Thug Life". Soon Little Psycho joined the group, under the name Syke. Later Macadoshis and The Rated R joined the group. They signed with Interscope Records and recorded an LP titled Thug Life, Volume I. Tupac's stepbrother, Mopreme Shakur, later joined the group.

Thug Life, Volume I 
On September 26, 1994, Thug Life, Volume I was released.

The first single and video was "Pour Out a Little Liquor" (which originally appeared on the Above the Rim soundtrack, released six months earlier), which was a Tupac solo song.

Tupac performed "Out on Bail" at the 1994 Source Awards. The album was originally released on Shakur's label Out da Gutta. Tupac's mother's label, Amaru Entertainment, has since gained the rights to the album.

The track "How Long Will They Mourn Me?" appeared on Tupac's 1998 Greatest Hits album.

Thug Life, Volume I had sold 478,419 copies in the United States as of 2011.

Stretch's death
On November 30, 1995, Stretch died after being shot four times in the back by three men who pulled up alongside his minivan in Queens Village. He was killed exactly one year after 2Pac's 1994 Quad Studio shooting.

Original members
 Tupac ( 1996)
 Stretch (a.k.a. Big Stretch) (d. 1995)
 Big Syke (a.k.a. Little Psycho or Mussolini) (d. 2016)
 Mopreme (a.k.a. Mocedes, The Wycked, Komani or Mo' Khomani)
 Macadoshis (a.k.a. The Original Mac 10)
 The Rated R (a.k.a. Super Star)

Discography

Studio albums
Thug Life, Volume I (1994) #42 Billboard 200; #6 R&B/Hip-Hop

References

African-American musical groups
Hip hop groups from California
Gangsta rap groups
G-funk groups
Hip hop collectives
Interscope Records artists
Jive Records artists